Central Devon is a constituency represented in the House of Commons of the UK Parliament since 2010 by Mel Stride, a Conservative.

History 
The constituency was created for the 2010 general election, following a review of parliamentary representation in Devon by the Boundary Commission for England, which increased seats in the county from 11 to 12. Central Devon covers parts of the East Devon, Mid Devon, Teignbridge and West Devon districts.

The wards from the last election presented a notional Conservative majority of just over 1,700, making it a marginal seat at the first election. Despite this, Mel Stride's majority was 17.1 percentage points and an absolute majority.

Boundaries 

The constituency contains electoral wards from four districts.

From East Devon: Exe Valley;
From Mid Devon: Boniface, Bradninch, Cadbury, Lawrence, Newbrooke, Sandford and Creedy, Silverton, Taw, Taw Vale, Upper Yeo, Way, Yeo;
From Teignbridge: Ashburton and Buckfastleigh, Bovey Tracey, Chudleigh, Haytor, Kenn Valley, Moorland, Teignbridge North, Teign Valley;
From West Devon: Chagford, Drewsteignton, Exbourne, Hatherleigh, Lew Valley, North Tawton, Okehampton East, Okehampton West, South Tawton.

Members of Parliament

Elections

Elections in the 2010s

See also 
 List of parliamentary constituencies in Devon

Notes

References

External links 
nomis Constituency Profile for Central Devon – presenting data from the ONS annual population survey and other official statistics.
 Central Devon Conservatives
 Central Devon Liberal Democrats
 Central Devon Labour Party

Parliamentary constituencies in Devon
Parliamentary constituencies in South West England
Constituencies of the Parliament of the United Kingdom established in 2010